Nikos Paraskevopoulos is a Greek criminologist who 
is a former Greek Minister of Justice, Transparency and Human Rights. He was a Professor of criminal law at the Aristotle University of Thessaloniki's Law School.
In the September 2015 Greek legislative election, he was elected MP for the Thessaloniki A constituency with Syriza. He has also served as the Minister of Justice of Greece from 27 January to 28 August 2015.

Paraskevopoulos was responsible for criminal matters under former Minister of Justice George Kouvelakis (1993–95), and for prison inmates rehabilitation programs from 1988 to 1997. He is the vice president of KETHEA, the largest drug-addicts' rehabilitation and social reintegration network in Greece.

While in Syriza's 2012 shadow cabinet, Zoe Konstantopoulou had been nominated for justice, after the January 2015 legislative election it was decided to give the post to independent expert Paraskevopoulos.

References

|-

Academic staff of the Aristotle University of Thessaloniki
Greek criminologists
Independent politicians in Greece
Justice ministers of Greece
Living people
Greek MPs 2015–2019
Greek MPs 2019–2023
MPs of Thessaloniki
1949 births
Politicians from Athens